The Rajasthan Sampark Kranti Express is a Superfast train belonging to North Western Railway zone that runs between Delhi Sarai Rohilla and Bikaner Junction in India. It is currently being operated with 22463/22464 train numbers on tri-weekly basis.

Service

The 22463/Rajasthan Sampark Kranti Express has an average speed of 57 km/hr and covers 684 km in 12h 5m. The  22464/Rajasthan Sampark Kranti Express  has an average speed of 58 km/hr and covers 684 km in 12h 30m.

Route and halts 

The important halts of the train are:

Coach composite

The train has standard ICF rakes with max speed of 110 kmph. The train consists of 9 coaches :

 1 AC II Tier
 1 AC III Tier
 2 Sleeper Coaches
 3 General Unreserved
 2 Seating cum Luggage Rake

Traction

Both trains are hauled by an Abu Road Loco Shed based WDM 3A diesel locomotive from Bikaner to Delhi and vice versa.

Rake Sharing 

Direction Reversal

Train Reverses its direction 1 times:

Notes

See also 

 Delhi Sarai Rohilla railway station
 Bikaner Junction railway station
 Rajasthan Sampark Kranti Express

References

External links 

 22463/Rajasthan Sampark Kranti Express
 22464/Rajasthan Sampark Kranti Express

Transport in Bikaner
Transport in Delhi
Sampark Kranti Express trains
Rail transport in Rajasthan
Rail transport in Delhi